The 25th congressional district of Illinois was a congressional district for the United States House of Representatives in Illinois.  It was eliminated as a result of the 1960 Census. It was last represented by Kenneth J. Gray who was redistricted into the 21st district.

List of members representing the district

Electoral history

1960 – 1952

1950 – 1942

1940 – 1932

1930 – 1922

1920 – 1912

1910 – 1902

References 

 Congressional Biographical Directory of the United States 1774–present

Former congressional districts of the United States
25
1903 establishments in Illinois
Constituencies established in 1903
1963 disestablishments in Illinois
Constituencies disestablished in 1963